Lori Alexis McGill Johnson (born August 5, 1972) is an American academic and social justice advocate. She is the executive director and co-founder of the Perception Institute, an anti-bias research group, and the president of Planned Parenthood.

Early life and education 
McGill Johnson was born in New York City in 1972 and raised by her mother and father. Her mother worked her way up from a secretary to an executive-level position at AT&T. McGill Johnson's childhood was strongly influenced by her parents' pride in black culture.

In 1993, she graduated from Princeton University with a bachelor's degree in political science and a focus in Latin-American social movements. She went on to receive a Master of Arts from Yale University in 1995, also in political science.

Career 
McGill Johnson taught political science and African-American studies at both Yale and Wesleyan University. She served as political director for Russell Simmons' "Hip-Hop Summit Action Network", and was the executive director of Citizen Change during the 2004 election season, launching their "Vote or Die!" campaign.

In 2009, she co-founded the Perception Institute (formerly known as the American Values Institute), a research group studying bias reduction and discrimination, and was their executive director. She co-created the curriculum for Starbucks' racial bias training in May 2018.

On July 16, 2019, McGill Johnson was announced as Planned Parenthood's acting president after the termination of Leana Wen. McGill Johnson was previously a board member and was the board's chair from 2013 to 2015. At that time, the Perception Institute listed her as being "on leave." On June 26, 2020, she was elevated to permanent president and CEO of Planned Parenthood.

McGill Johnson has also served on the boards of New York Civil Liberties Union, the Center for Social Inclusion, and Citizen Engagement Lab.

Personal life
She lives in New York City. She is married to Robert Johnson, who is the president of the Institute for New Economic Thinking. They have two daughters.

References 

Living people
Presidents of Planned Parenthood
Princeton University alumni
Yale Graduate School of Arts and Sciences alumni
Yale University faculty
Wesleyan University faculty
People from New York City
African-American feminism
1972 births